The Western Hemisphere Warm Pool (WHWP) is a region of sea surface temperatures (SST) warmer than 28.5 °C that develops west of Central America in the spring, then expands to the tropical waters to the east.

The WHWP includes the tropical Atlantic Ocean (TNA) east of the Lesser Antilles, Caribbean Sea, Gulf of Mexico, and eastern north Pacific Ocean (ENP).

A WHWP heating cycle begins with warmth in the eastern North Pacific in the spring.  A dipole pattern off Central America appears due to surges of cooler, drier air through the gap at the Isthmus of Tehuantepec.  During spring, the warm pools grow and merge.  Their warmth and moisture feed the Mexican monsoon.  By summer, the warmth spreads across the Gulf of Mexico and Caribbean areas.

Relationship with Atlantic Hurricanes 
Recent studies have shown that the Atlantic portion of the WHWP (AWP) is significantly correlated with Atlantic hurricane activity. A large (or small) AWP reduces (or increases) the tropospheric vertical wind shear in the main development region for Atlantic hurricanes and increases (or decreases) the moist static instability of the troposphere, both of which favor (or don't favor) the intensification of tropical storms into major hurricanes.

Relationship with El Niño 
A study of climate records has shown a relationship between El Niño and the Western Hemisphere Warm Pool (WHWP).  During a normal Northern Hemisphere winter, diabatic heating over the Amazon drives a Hadley cell with descending air over an anticyclone north of 20°N in the subtropical North Atlantic and associated northeast trade winds between Africa and the Caribbean.  An El Niño weakens the Amazonian cell, the anticyclone and the easterly tradewinds, causing the tropical North Atlantic to warm more than usual in the spring.  About half of El Niño events persist sufficiently into the spring months for the warm pool to become unusually large by summer.

Climate events in area 
 800-900: Collapse of Classical Maya civilization due to drought. Yucatán Peninsula in present-day Mexico.
 August 29, 2005: Hurricane Katrina. New Orleans, Mississippi and Gulf Coast region.

References 

 Wang, C., S.-K. Lee and D. B. Enfield, 2008: Atlantic warm pool acting as a link between Atlantic multidecadal oscillation and Atlantic tropical cyclone activity. Geochem. Geophys. Geosyst., 9, Q05V03, . (In the special issue of "Interactions between climate and tropical cyclones on all timescales")
 Wang, C., S.-K. Lee and D.B. Enfield, 2008: Climate response to anomalously large and small Atlantic warm pools during the summer. Journal of Climate, Vol. 21, No. 11, 2437–2450.
 Wang, C., S.-K. Lee and D.B. Enfield, 2007: Impact of the Atlantic warm pool on the summer climate of the western hemisphere . Journal of Climate, Vol. 20, No. 20, 5021-5040.
 Lee, S.-K., D.B. Enfield and C. Wang, 2007: What drives seasonal onset and decay of the Western Hemisphere Warm Pool?. Journal of Climate, Vol. 20, No. 10, 2133-2146.
 Wang, C. and S.-K. Lee, 2007: Atlantic warm pool, Caribbean low-level jet, and their potential impact on Atlantic hurricanes. Geophysical Research Letter, Vol. 34, No. L02703, .
 Wang, C., D.B. Enfield, S.-K. Lee and C.W. Landsea, 2006: Influences of Atlantic Warm Pool on western hemisphere summer rainfall and Atlantic Hurricanes. Journal of Climate, Vol. 19, No. 12, 3011-3028.
 Enfield, D.B. and S.-K. Lee, 2005: The Heat Balance of the Western Hemisphere Warm Pool. Journal of Climate, Vol. 18, No. 14, 2662-2681.
 Enfield, D.B., S.-K. Lee, and C. Wang, 2005: How are large Western Hemisphere Warm Pools formed?. Progress in Oceanography.
 Wang, C., 2005: ENSO, Atlantic climate variability, and the Walker and Hadley circulations. In The Hadley Circulation: Present, Past, and Future, H. F. Diaz and R. S. Bradley, Eds., Kluwer Academic Publisher: 173-202.
 Lee, S.-K., D.B. Enfield, and C. Wang, 2003: Ocean general circulation model sensitivity experiments on the annual cycle of Western Hemisphere Warm Pool. Journal of Geophysical Research 110: C09004, doi=10.1029/2004JC002640. .
 Wang, C. and D.B. Enfield, 2003: A Further Study of the Tropical Western Hemisphere Warm Pool. Journal of Climate 16 (16): 1476-1493.
 Wang, C. and D.B. Enfield, 2001: The tropical Western Hemisphere warm pool. Geophys. Res. Lett. 28: 1635-1638. .

External links 
 Central American coral records

Regional climate effects
Tropical meteorology
Natural history of the Americas
Natural history of Central America
Natural history of the Caribbean